Structuralism is a 1949 approach to anthropology and the human sciences in general, derived from linguistics, that attempts to analyze a specific field as a complex system of interrelated parts.

Structuralism may also refer to:

Structuralism (architecture), movement in architecture and urban planning in the middle of the 20th century
Structuralism (biology), school of biological thought that deals with the law-like behaviour of the structure of organisms
Structuralism (international relations), studies the impact of world economic structures on the politics of countries
Structuralism (linguistics), a 1916 theory that a human language is self-contained structure related to other elements which make up its existence
Structuralism (philosophy of mathematics), theory of mathematics as structure
Structuralism (philosophy of science), theory of science, reconstructing empirical theories
Structuralism (psychology), a 1879 theory with the goal to describe the structure of the mind
Structuralism (sociology), also known as structural functionalism
Structural Marxism, a 1960s approach to Marxist philosophy based on structuralism
Structural anthropology, a 1949 theory of fundamental components in all cultures, stories and rituals, a so-called "deep grammar"
Structural film, an experimental film movement prominent in the US in the 1960s and which developed into the Structural/materialist films in the UK in the 1970s